Benjamin Neil Paddock Onwukwe (born 21 August 1957 in Brixton, London, England) is a British film, radio, television, theatre and voice actor.

He is perhaps best known for appearing as Firefighter Stuart 'Recall' MacKenzie from 1991 to 2002 in London's Burning, a dramatic television series first aired on the British television network ITV.

Career

In addition to his most famous role in London's Burning, Onwukwe has frequently appeared on television in, among others, Waiting for God,Casualty, Holby City, The Bill, Inspector Morse, Coronation Street, Between the Lines, Delta Wave. His most recent television appearance was in 2018 in the Netflix series Safe.

Onwukwe has also worked in various schools across the country, appeared in theatrical productions, recorded several radio plays and narrated audio books including Laura Shepherd-Robinson's Blood and Sugar.

He was also a member of the BBC's Radio Drama Company.

In 2019, he performed for the Royal Shakespeare Company at The Other Place in a new play by Robin French, Crooked Dances.

Onwukwe appears in the 2021 ITV drama series Professor T as the father of Detective Constable Lisa Donckers.  His character is suffering (somewhat ironically) with a form of memory impairment, mistaking his daughter for his wife.

In 2022 he played Harley Joseph in Death in Paradise S11:E4.

Notes

External links
 

1957 births
Audiobook narrators
British male film actors
British male radio actors
British male television actors
British male voice actors
People from Brixton
Living people
Male actors from London
20th-century English male actors
21st-century English male actors